Terence Osborne Clarke (AM) (born 1935) is a retired Australian theatrical director and composer who also worked as an actor, pianist, musical director, teacher and dramaturg. On Australian Day 2007 he was installed as a Member of the Order of Australia for service to the performing arts as a director, actor, writer, composer and educator.

Early life

Clarke was born in 1935 in Sydney and educated at Shore and the University of Sydney (resident St Paul's College), graduating BA with first-class honours in Music. While a student he appeared as Robert in the Sydney University Players' rendition of Peter Ustinov's play The Indifferent Shepherd in August 1953. A reviewer for the Sydney Morning Herald observed, "[he] had little to say but said it nicely". One of his fellow students at university was Charles Colman. After graduation Clarke taught at All Saints College, Bathurst (where he had attended primary school) and at Cranbrook School, Sydney, where he became head of mathematics and in charge of drama.

Career

Terence Clarke's career has alternated between theatre work and teaching. While in England during 1959-1960 he acted at the Marlowe Theatre, Canterbury. In 1970 he left teaching to return to theatre and music. During his theatre career he has worked as an actor, artistic director, composer, musical director, writer and pianist from 1963 to 2016. Early work was as actor and musical director at Nimrod Street Theatre, Darlinghurst. His appointments have included: Associate Director of Perth's National Theatre at the Playhouse where he also acted, composed and played piano; founding Artistic Director of the Hunter Valley Theatre Company, Australia's first professional regional theatre company; Artistic Director of the Australian National Playwrights Conference; and Head of Directing at the National Institute of Dramatic Art, where he continued to teach. He directed the world premieres of A Happy and Holy Occasion (John O'Donoghue) and Backyard (Janis Balodis). He has taught at the West Australian Institute of Technology, the University of Newcastle, and the University of New South Wales, where he held a demi-lectureship for a year.

Clarke wrote three musicals to book and lyrics by Nick Enright: The Venetian Twins (cast album, Folkways Records), produced by all state theatre companies, and toured; Variations (Winner of the Play Award, New South Wales Premier's Literary Awards, 1983) not seen since its original Nimrod Theatre production runs in 1982 and 1983; and Summer Rain, commissioned by NIDA for the graduating class of 1984 and directed by Gale Edwards, later revised three times for productions at the Sydney and Queensland Theatre Companies.

His other compositions include: a ballad opera, Flash Jim Vaux (book and lyrics, Ron Blair). Leonard Glickfeld of The Australian Jewish News reviewed its performance at Russell Street Theatre, Melbourne in December 1973. Glickfeld praised Blair's writing including the ballads' lyrics, which were set to music by Clarke and Colman. However the lyrics "are not always matched by the quality or rhythms of the music... about four tunes which really work." Blair later dropped 'Vaux' from the play's title. Clarke also provided five plays with music - Catspaw and Jarrabin (both Dorothy Hewett), Lysistrata (John Croyston), Henry and Peter and Henry and Me (George Hutchinson), and Gone with Hardy (David Allen); incidental music; and song-settings. Late in 1992 he returned to Canberra to direct the Canberra Theatre's version of The Pirates of Penzance (or The Slave of Duty), which ran from 15 to 30 January 1993. He worked with set and costume designer Tim Kobin to eschew the traditional pantomime renditions and depict the titular pirates as "predators, feral, and at the same time like boys who get dirty, tattooed."

Honours

On Australia Day (26 January) 2007 Clarke was appointed as a Member of the Order of Australia "for service to the performing arts as a director, actor, writer, composer, and educator."

Theatre roles

References

1935 births
Living people
Australian theatre directors
Members of the Order of Australia
Australian male composers
Australian composers
Australian musical theatre composers
People educated at Sydney Church of England Grammar School
University of Sydney alumni